The SAFF U-18/U-19/U-20 Championship is a biennial football championship for male footballers under the age of 20 and is organized by the South Asian Football Federation (SAFF). The championship was held for the first time in August 2015 in Nepal. The tournaments are held just before AFC U-19 Championship qualification matches, keeping in mind about proper preparation for that.

Results
U19 format

U18 format

U20 format

Participating nations

Legend

 – Champions
 – Runners-up
 – Third place
 – Fourth place
5th – Fifth place
 – Semifinals
GS – Group stage
q – Qualified for upcoming tournament
 — Hosts
 ×  – Did not enter
 •  – Did not qualify
 ×  – Withdrew before qualification
 — Withdrew/Disqualified after qualification
 — Not part of SAFF

Notes

Awards

See also
SAFF Championship
SAFF U-17 Championship
SAFF Women's Championship

References

 
SAFF competitions
Under-18 association football
Youth football competitions
Recurring sporting events established in 2015
2015 establishments in Asia